The Men's 1500 metre freestyle competition of the 2018 African Swimming Championships was held on 14 September 2018.

Records
Prior to the competition, the existing world and championship records were as follows.

The following new records were set during this competition.

Results

Final ranking
The races were started on 14 September at 10:00.

References

Men's 1500 metre freestyle